Between the 10th and the 19th centuries the hundreds of Norfolk and the boroughs of Norwich, King's Lynn, Thetford and Great Yarmouth were the administrative units of the English county of Norfolk. Each hundred had a separate council that met each month to rule on local judicial and taxation matters.

The system of dividing shires into hundreds was established in East Anglia following the conquest by Wessex in the early 10th century. The boundaries described at the time of the Domesday Survey of 1086 remained largely unchanged up to the 1970s. The 36 Domesday hundreds were subdivided into leets, now lost, and the boroughs of Norwich and Thetford ranked as separate hundreds, while Great Yarmouth was the chief town of three hundreds. Two of Thetford's parishes now lie partially in Norfolk with the remainder in Suffolk. The Domesday hundred of Emneth is now included in Freebridge, which was split into Freebridge-Lynn and Freebridge-Marshland. Docking hundred was then incorporated into Smithdon, and the boundary between Brothercross and Gallow hundreds was changed. By the 19th century there were 33 hundreds.

The leet court boundaries were more fluid and transient than the hundred court boundaries. At the time of Domesday, the parishes of the hundreds of Brothercross and Gallow "were strangely intermixed".

Sites of hundred courts
The hundred courts were held at various sites across the county:

Parishes

In 1845 the hundreds of Norfolk contained the following parishes.

In addition the following four towns were considered as separate boroughs.

References

See also
History of Norfolk
List of hundreds of England and Wales

 
Norfolk